Pammy Varma (1952 – 2015) was an Indian film director and producer in Bollywood. In a career spanning two decades, he worked as the assistant director/second-unit director of Manmohan Desai, leading director of the 1970s, before making his debut as the co-producer of Mard (1985), which was the second highest-grossing film of 1985 and subsequently his debut as the independent director of Ek Misaal (1986).

Family background
Pammy Varma was the son of Usha and Munshiram Varma. He grew up in Bombay, India and graduated from the Don Bosco High School in Matunga, Bombay in 1968. Subsequently, he attended the Ruparel College, also in Matuga, Bombay, but gave up his college-life when he started working as the assistant director/second-unit director of Manmohan Desai, leading director of the 1970s.

Pammy had several affiliations with Bollywood for much of his life. Pammy's father, Munshiram Varma, and his five brothers founded Varma Films, known for box-office hits like Suhaag Raat (1948), Patanga (1949) and Badal (1951).  Suhaag Raat was the seventh highest-grossing film of 1948; Patanga was the seventh highest-grossing film of 1949; and finally, 
Badal  was the eighth highest-grossing film of 1951.   Munshiram (Pammy's father) was also the producer of four films: Suhaag Raat, Thes (1949), Neki Aur Badi (1949) and Aurat (1953).  Pammy's uncle, Bhagwandas Varma (Munshiram's brother) was producer of Badal and Baghi Sipahi (1958) as well as the director of three films: Aurat, Pooja (1954) and Baghi Sipahi.

Other relatives in the Indian film industry include: Pammy's sister Madhu Makkar née Varma, who played the female lead in Insaaniyat (1974) opposite veteran actor Shashi Kapoor; Surinder Makkar, spouse of Madhu Makkar, who worked as a character actor in Insaaniyat and Pammy's brother, Sunil Varma, who was the executive producer of Insaaniyat. Finally, more relatives in the film industry include film and TV actors Sid Makkar and Giriraj Kabra. Sid Makkar is Pammy's nephew and Giriraj Kabra is the spouse of Pammy's niece, Seher Kabra née Varma.

Film career
Pammy Varma started his career in Bollywood by working as the assistant director/second-unit director of Manmohan Desai in 1972 with two back-to-back films: Bhai Ho To Aisa (1972) and Raampur Ka Lakshman (1972). Both of these films were commercially successful. Raampur Ka Lakshman was the 10th highest-grossing film of the year, whereas Bhai Ho To Aisa was 11th highest- grossing film of the same year.
For the next two years, each of the films for which Pammy worked for Manmohan Desai were also commercially successful.  Aa Gale Lag Jaa (1973)  was the tenth highest-grossing film of the year 1973 and Roti (1974) was the seventh highest-grossing film of the year 1974.

The banner year, both for the total number of films released as well as their commercial success, was the year 1977 : Amar Akbar Anthony was the highest-grossing film of the year; Dharam Veer was the second highest-grossing film of the year; Parvarish was the fourth highest-grossing film of the year; finally Chacha Bhatija was the fifth highest-grossing film of the year.
All four films were released in 1977 and Pammy was the assistant director/second-unit director of Manmohan Desai for all four of them.

Box-office accomplishment was sustained for each of the four films for which Pammy continued to be  Manmohan's assistant from 1979 through 1983.  
Suhaag (1979) was the highest-grossing film of the year 1979. Naseeb (1981) was the second highest-grossing film of the year 1981. Desh Premee (1982) was the tenth highest-grossing film of the year 1982. Finally, Coolie (1983) was the highest-grossing film of the year 1983.

Eventually, after working for Manmohan Desai for years, Pammy made his production debut as the co-producer of Mard (1985), which was the eighth highest-grossing film of the 1980s. Subsequently, in the next year, Pammy made his debut as the independent director of Ek Misaal (1986).

Filmography

References

External links 
 

1952 births
2015 deaths
Hindi film producers
Hindi-language film directors